Hibbertia serpyllifolia is a species of flowering plant in the family Dilleniaceae and is endemic to Queensland. It is a small, spreading to low-lying shrub with many stems, oblong leaves and single yellow flowers on the ends of branches, with twelve to twenty stamens in groups around three hairy carpels.

Description
Flowering occurs from July to October.

Taxonomy
Hibbertia serpyllifolia was first formally described by Augustin Pyramus de Candolle in his Regni Vegetabilis Systema Naturale from an unpublished description by Robert Brown. Previously broadly defined and considered conspecific with Hibbertia ericifolia and thought to occur across eastern Australia to Tasmania, it is now recognised as only occurring in central Queensland.

Distribution and habitat
This hibbertia grows in heath, grassland and the understorey of coastal forests in the Port Curtis region in mid-northern Queensland.

Conservation status
Hibbertia serpyllifolia is listed as of "least concern" under the Queensland Government Nature Conservation Act 1992.

References

serpyllifolia
Flora of Queensland
Taxa named by Robert Brown (botanist, born 1773)
Plants described in 1817